Arturo Muñoz Sánchez is a Mexican luchador, or professional wrestler who is best known for his time performing Mexican professional wrestling promotion Consejo Mundial de Lucha Libre (CMLL), portraying a rudo ("Bad guy") wrestling character La Bestia del Ring. He is the father of wrestlers William Arturo Muñoz González (aka, Rush) and masked wrestlers Dralístico and Dragon Lee, and often teams up with one or more of his sons.

Muñoz has worked under various ring names during his career, working under the character Comandante Pierroth or simply Pierroth as a successor to the original Pierroth Jr. He has previously worked as Dr. Kent, Poder Indio, Poder Boricua, Poder Mexica and Toro Blanco.

Muñoz, as La Bestia del Ring, was part of the Los Ingobernables ("The Ungovernables")  stable with his son Rush and El Terrible until late 2019. He was initially brought into CMLL in 2001 as the masked character Poder Boricua to be a part of Los Boricuas. When he returned to CMLL in 2013 as "Comandante Pierroth" he led his own version of "Los Boricuas", called La Comando Caribeño with Pierrothito, Pequeno Violencia, La Comandante and Zeuxis.

Personal life
Three of Muñoz' sons have followed in his footsteps and became professional wrestlers, all working for Consejo Mundial de Lucha Libre (CMLL), the oldest works under the ring name Rush, his younger son works as Dralístico (fka the second Místico) and his youngest son made his debut in 2014 as Dragon Lee. Three of Muñoz' brothers have also been involved with professional wrestling for a number of years, his brother Javier Descalza Coronado wrestled as Franco Columbo and then became one of the lead trainers for CMLL and his younger brothers work under the names "Pit Bull I" and "Pit Bull II"

Professional wrestling career

Early career
Muñoz trained under world-renowned lucha libre trainer Diablo Velasco before making his in-ring debut in 1994. Initially he worked under the ring name "Dr. Kent", a generic doctor character in a white mask, white trunks and white tights in the tradition of Dr. Wagner. In subsequent years he would work as "Toro Blanco" (Spanish for "White Bull") and later on begin working for CMLL as Poder Indio ("Indian Power"), another enmascarado character.

Consejo Mundial de Lucha Libre (2001–2019)

Los Boricuas (2001–2004)

In 2001 Pierroth, Jr. formed a new group in CMLL called Los Boricuas where all members either actually were from Puerto Rico or pledged their allegiance to Puerto Rico as part of the storyline. Muñoz adopted a new name, Poder Boricua (Puerto Rican Power), a new storyline nationality and ring gear adorned with the Puerto Rican flag. As part of Los Boricuas he would at times team with El Boricua, Bulldog, Gran Markus Jr., El Hijo del Pierroth, The Killer, Mastin, Nitro, Rico Suave, 'Veneno and Violencia. Poder Boricua was a regular on the low-to-mid card, especially in Boricuas trios matches. Poder Boricua, Gran Markus, Jr. and Violencia unsuccessfully challenged for the Mexican National Trios Championship but lost to the team of Mr. Niebla, Olímpico and Safari. In early 2002 Poder Boricua and Gran Markus, Jr. left Los Boricuas and turned tecnicos (wrestlers who portray the good guys), fighting against the Puerto Ricans. In mid-2002 Muñoz changed his ring name again, becoming "Poder Mexica" ("Mexican Power"), complete with ring gear adorned with the Mexican flag. As part of his storyline against Los Boricuas he teamed up with Mr. Mexico for a Luchas de Apuestas, or "bet match", where Poder Mexica put his mask on the line and Mr. Mexico risked his hair on the outcome of the match. On July 14, 2002 Veneno and Violencia defeated the tecnico duo, forcing Poder Mexica to unmask and reveal his real name, Arthur Muñoz.

Toro Blanco (2004–2013)
He remained in CMLL until 2003 where he left the promotion and dropped the "Poder Mexica" character, reverting to the "Toro Blanco" character on the Mexican independent circuit. Over the subsequent years Muñoz worked less in the ring and focused more or raising and training his sons for a professional wrestling career. His oldest son, William Arturo Muñoz made his wrestling debut in 2008 and when he signed with CMLL in 2009 Muñoz accompanied his son for his introduction, making it clear that Rush (Wiliam's rig name) was the son of Toro Blanco and played up the second-generation wrestler. Rush would wear ring gear similar to his father and actually earned the nickname "Toro Blanco". He would later also be acknowledge as the father of Dragon Lee, later known as Místico as well as the second Dragon Lee.

Pierroth (2013–2017)
In 2013 CMLL introduced a version of Pierroth, paying the original, retired owner of the character for the use of the mask and name. Muñoz was introduced as the masked "Comandante Pierroth", leader of La Comando Caribeño ("The Caribbean Commando") consisting of himself, Pierrothito, Pequeno Violencia, La Comandante and Zeuxis. The group existed more in name than as an actual team, there were no regular size male competitors for Comandante Pierroth to team up with for matches. During 2014 Comandante Pierroth, sometimes billed simply as Pierroth, began teaming on a regular basis with Misterioso, Jr. and Sagrado to form a regular trio. In early 2015 it was officially acknowledged as working under the name La Comando Caribeno with both Misterioso, Jr. and Sagrada adopting the imagery of the Puerto Rican flag in their ring gear. On March 18, 2016, Pierroth joined his son Rush's Los Ingobernables stable by helping him defeat Máximo Sexy in a Hair vs. Hair Lucha de Apuestas. On March 17, 2017, at Homenaje a Dos Leyendas, Pierroth lost his mask to Diamante Azul in a Lucha de Apuestas.

La Bestia del Ring (2017–2019)
After losing the Pierroth mask Muñoz began using the name La Besta del Ring ("The Beast of the Ring"), although some promotional material still referred to him as "Pierroth" for a while afterwards. After his mask loss Bestia del Ring became involved in a storyline feud with fellow rudo Vangelly over Vangelly's desire to join Los Ingobernables, which was rejected by both Bestia del Ring and Rush. The storyline built to a "hair vs. hair" Lucha de Apuestas match between the two as part of the 2017 Universal Championship finals show, which ended with Vangellys both defeated and shaved bald as a result. On February 23, 2018 El Terrible joined Los Ingobernables, teaming with Bestia del Ring and Rush for trios matches. The Universal Championship was the start of a storyline between Los Ingobernables (El Terrible and La Bestia del Ring) and Los Hermanos Chavez (Ángel de Oro and Niebla Roja), as El Terrible cheated to defeat Niebla Roja with the held of La Bestia. After several matches between the two sides, they all signed a contract for a Luchas de Apuestas match as the main event of CMLL's 2019 Homenaje a Dos Leyendas event. On March 15, 2019 Los Hermanos Chavez defeated Los Ingobernables two falls to one, forcing both El Terrible and La Bestia del Ring to have all their hair shaved off.

On September 29, 2019, Muñoz announced that he had left CMLL and was now an independent alongside his two sons, Rush and Dragon Lee, who had been fired by CMLL.

Lucha Libre AAA Worldwide (2019–present)
On October 31, 2019, Rush and La Bestia would appear in Nación Lucha Libre, reuniting with former stablemate La Máscara. The trio dubbed themselves La Facción Ingobernable (based on the Los Ingobernables name from CMLL). On December 14 at AAA's Guerra de Titanes, it was announced that Rush, La Bestia del Ring, Killer Kross, L.A. Park and Konnan were forming a new version of La Facción Ingobernable.

Championships and accomplishments
Kaoz Lucha Libre
Kaoz Trios Championship (1 time)  with El Hijo de L.A. Park and L.A. Park Jr.
 Pro Wrestling Illustrated
 Ranked No. 368 of the top 500 singles wrestlers in the PWI 500 in 2020

Luchas de Apuestas record

References

External links 
 
 

Year of birth missing (living people)
Living people
Mexican male professional wrestlers
Masked wrestlers